The Aviasouz Cruise is a Russian ultralight trike, designed and produced by Aviasouz of Kazan. The aircraft is supplied as a complete ready-to-fly-aircraft.

The company was formed by former employees of the Tupolev Design Bureau.

Design and development
It features a cable-braced hang glider-style high-wing, weight-shift controls, a two-seats-in-side-by-side configuration open cockpit with a unique fibreglass cockpit fairing, tricycle landing gear with wheel pants and a single engine in pusher configuration.

The aircraft is made from bolted-together aluminum tubing, with its single surface wing covered in Dacron sailcloth. Its  span wing is supported by a single tube-type kingpost and uses an "A" frame weight-shift control bar. The powerplant is a twin cylinder, air-cooled, two-stroke, dual-ignition  Rotax 582 engine, with the four cylinder, air and liquid-cooled, four-stroke, dual-ignition  Rotax 912 engine optional.

Specifications (Cruise)

References

External links

2000s Russian sport aircraft
2000s Russian ultralight aircraft
Single-engined pusher aircraft
Ultralight trikes